Annegret "Anne" Kroniger (born September 24, 1952, in Bochum, Nordrhein-Westfalen) is a female German athlete, who mainly competed in the 100 metres.

She competed for West Germany at the 1976 Summer Olympics in the women's 4 x 100 metres held in Montreal, Quebec, Canada, where she won the silver medal with her teammates Elvira Possekel, Inge Helten and Olympic 100 metre champion Annegret Richter.

References
 

Living people
1952 births
West German female sprinters
Olympic silver medalists for West Germany
Athletes (track and field) at the 1972 Summer Olympics
Athletes (track and field) at the 1976 Summer Olympics
Olympic athletes of West Germany
Sportspeople from Bochum
European Athletics Championships medalists
Medalists at the 1976 Summer Olympics
Olympic silver medalists in athletics (track and field)
Olympic female sprinters